Venice Blue is an album by American singer Bobby Darin, released in 1965. It peaked at 132 on the Billboard charts.

Venice Blue was also released in the United Kingdom as I Wanna Be Around with a slightly altered cover using the same photo. A compilation CD was released by Capitol’s parent company EMI in 1999 including You’re the Reason I’m Living and I Wanna Be Around.

Reception

In his Allmusic review, critic JT Griffith wrote “Venice Blue is not a dramatic departure for Bobby Darin, but a solid collection nonetheless. Really of interest to fans looking to complete their collection. Well-arranged and well-sung, but not the most accessible album for the neo-swing set.”

Track listing
”Venice Blue” (Bobby Darin, Charles Aznavour, Gene Lees) – 2:36
”I Wanna Be Around” (Johnny Mercer, Sadie Vimmerstadt) – 2:12
”Somewhere” (Leonard Bernstein, Stephen Sondheim) – 2:34
”The Good Life” (Sacha Distel, Jack Reardon) – 2:25
”Dear Heart” (Ray Evans, Jay Livingston, Henry Mancini) – 3:14
”Softly, As I Leave You” (Giorgio Calabrese, Hal Shaper, Tony De Vita) – 2:57
”You Just Don’t Know” (Darin) – 2:25
"There Ain’t No Sweet Gal Worth the Salt of My Tears” (Fred Fisher) – 3:03
”Who Can I Turn To?” (Leslie Bricusse, Anthony Newley) – 2:39
”A Taste of Honey” (Ric Marlow, Bobby Scott) – 2:36
”In a World Without You” (Rudy Clark, Darin) – 2:39

Personnel
Bobby Darin – vocals
Richard Weiss – arrangements
Ernie Freeman – arrangements
Tommy Tedesco – guitar
Carol Kaye – guitar
René Hall – guitar
Joe Mondragon – bass
Chuck Berghofer – bass
Earl Palmer – drums
Emil Richards – tympani, maracas, vibes
Ray Johnson – piano
Tony Terran – trumpet
Bill Pitman – trumpet
Dick Nash – trombone
Harry Betts – trombone
Milt Bernhart – trombone
Ken Shroyer – trombone
Lew McCreary – trombone
Lou Blackburn – trombone
Dave Wells – trombone
Paul Horn – saxophone
Bill Green – saxophone
Plas Johnson – saxophone

References

1965 albums
Bobby Darin albums
Capitol Records albums